Châteauneuf may refer to:

Places in France called Châteauneuf alone
 Châteauneuf, Côte-d'Or
 Châteauneuf, Loire
 Châteauneuf, Saône-et-Loire
 Châteauneuf, Savoie
 Châteauneuf, Vendée

Places in France called Châteauneuf in combination
 Châteauneuf-du-Pape AOC, the wine region
 Châteauneuf-de-Bordette, Drôme
 Châteauneuf-de-Chabre, Hautes-Alpes
 Châteauneuf-de-Gadagne, Vaucluse
 Châteauneuf-de-Galaure, Drôme
 Châteauneuf-d'Entraunes, Alpes-Maritimes
 Châteauneuf-de-Randon, Lozère
 Châteauneuf-de-Vernoux, Ardèche
 Châteauneuf-d'Ille-et-Vilaine, Ille-et-Vilaine
 Châteauneuf-d'Oze, Hautes-Alpes
 Châteauneuf-du-Faou, Finistère
 Châteauneuf-du-Pape, Vaucluse
 Châteauneuf-du-Rhône, Drôme
 Châteauneuf-en-Thymerais, Eure-et-Loir
 Châteauneuf-Grasse, Alpes-Maritimes
 Châteauneuf-la-Forêt, Haute-Vienne
 Châteauneuf-le-Rouge, Bouches-du-Rhône
 Châteauneuf-les-Bains, Puy-de-Dôme
 Châteauneuf-les-Martigues, Bouches-du-Rhône
 Châteauneuf-Miravail, Alpes-de-Haute-Provence
 Châteauneuf-sur-Charente, Charente
 Châteauneuf-sur-Cher, Cher
 Châteauneuf-sur-Isère, Drôme
 Châteauneuf-sur-Loire, Loiret
 Châteauneuf-sur-Sarthe, Maine-et-Loire
 Châteauneuf-Val-de-Bargis, Nièvre
 Châteauneuf-Val-Saint-Donat, Alpes-de-Haute-Provence
 Châteauneuf-Villevieille, Alpes-Maritimes

See also
 Châtelneuf (disambiguation)
 Neufchâteau (disambiguation)